Aldina Dervisevic (born 29 May 2001) is a Luxembourgish footballer who plays as a defender for Dames Ligue 1 team Bettembourg and the Luxembourg women's national team.

International career
Dervisevic made her senior debut for Luxembourg on 21 September 2021 as an 89th-minute substitution in a 0–10 2023 FIFA Women's World Cup qualification home loss against England.

References

2001 births
Living people
Luxembourgian women's footballers
Women's association football defenders
Luxembourg women's international footballers
Luxembourgian people of Bosnia and Herzegovina descent